Om (sometimes stylized as OM) is an American doom metal band from San Francisco, California. Formed as a duo in 2003 by the rhythm section of the band Sleep (bassist Al Cisneros and drummer Chris Hakius), Om is currently a trio consisting of Cisneros, Emil Amos (drums), and Tyler Trotter (guitar).

History
Om's earliest works incorporate musical structures similar to Tibetan and Byzantine chant, as heard on the debut album Variations on a Theme. The band's name itself derives from the Hindu concept of Om, which refers to the natural vibration of the universe. Every album from  Pilgrimage onward features Eastern Orthodox iconography in the cover art.

Om's first three albums feature Al Cisneros on vocals and bass and Chris Hakius on drums.

On December 5, 2007, Om performed in Jerusalem. Their performance lasted for over five hours and a portion of that show was released on 12" vinyl by Southern Lord as Live at Jerusalem.

The band's 2007 album Pilgrimage was chosen as Mojo Magazine's "Underground Album of the Year". In that same year, Om famously played two multiple-hour shows, with one show in Jerusalem rumored to last somewhere between four and six hours. 

On January 31, 2008, Chris Hakius left the band and was replaced by drummer Emil Amos of Grails. On the last tour with Hakius songs that would later become "Gebel Barkal" and "Thebes" were being performed live.

On August 15, 2008, Om released a 7" 45 entitled "Gebel Barkal" for Sub Pop's Singles Club. A live vinyl-only LP, Conference Live, followed in 2009 on Important Records.

Om's fourth full-length studio album, God is Good, was recorded by Steve Albini and released by Drag City on September 29, 2009.

The band's fifth studio album, Advaitic Songs, was released by Drag City on July 24, 2012.  It met with critical acclaim.

In November 2013, the band played the final holiday camp edition of the world famous All Tomorrow's Parties festival in Camber Sands, England.

Members

Current
 Al Cisneros – bass, vocals 
 Emil Amos – drums 
 Tyler Trotter – guitar, synthesizer, percussion

Former
 Chris Hakius – drums 
 Robert Lowe – guitars, percussion, back-up vocals

Discography

Studio albums

Live albums

Singles and EPs

Singles and music videos
"State of Non-Return" (2012)

References

External links
Official website

2003 establishments in California
American doom metal musical groups
Drag City (record label) artists
Heavy metal musical groups from California
Heavy metal duos
American musical trios
Musical groups established in 2003
Sub Pop artists
American stoner rock musical groups
Drone metal musical groups